Mijar  is a village in the Manglore taluk in the city of Mangaluru of Dakshina Kannada district of  the Indian state of Karnataka. Tenkamijaru Grama Panchayat which is 30 km from Mangalore, 12 km from the famous pilgrimage site Jain Kashi. The Grama Panchayat Contains 2 Revenue Villages, cultivation as the main source of income, the level of education and the quality of life of the people are in general. Gram Panchayat consists of Scheduled Castes, Scheduled Tribes, Backward Classes and Others.Hindu Muslim Christian, Jains lead lives in harmony.

The village has a total of 7 wards and has 19 members, Anganwadi Primary School, High School and PU College are located in the Gram Panchayat area. Includes 2 Engineering Colleges and MBA Courses. Ayurvedic herbal preparation parmesis, operating cashew factory, are useful in improving the quality of life of people.The Panchayath  has its own fixed and variable assets and is always responsive to people's problems

There are mosques and temples  in the Panchayath area, The temple of Lord Vishnu and Somanatheshwara
 the village headman The Dargah of Muslims in Thodar is religiously famous, People are living in communion with social politics and religion.

Economy 
Traditionally women rolled beedies as a source of income.

Location 
Mijar is on National Highway 169 (old NH 13). It is accessible from Mangalore city (30 km away) by road. Mangalore International Airport is 20 km away from MIjar

It is 60 km from Udupi and 20 km from Karkala. Other nearby places are Venur (25 km), Belthangady (40 km), Kudremukh (70 km), Agumbe (75 km), Puttur (60km) Siddakatte (15 km) and Moodbidri (5 km)

Education 
The Mangalore Institute of Technology and Engineering is located close to Mijar.

Alvas Institute of Engineering and Technology is also located in Mijar

Religion 
Numerous temples are in Mijar, including Sri Vishnumoorthi Temple Mijar, Sri Somanatheshwara Temple in Kambettu, Sri Bhoothanatheshwara Temple in Shashthavu, Sri Gopalakrishna Temple in Baithari and Sri Mariyamma Temple in Daddi.

Geography 
The Nandini River originates from Kanakabettu in Mijar and flows westwards, encircling Sri Kateel Durgaparameshwari Temple.

References

Villages in Dakshina Kannada district